The tremoloa , plural tremoloas, is a stringed instrument belonging to the fretless zither family. It was produced in United States in response to the rapid increase in popularity of Hawaiian music during the 1920s, and continued to be produced until the 1950s.
Musical collective Broken Social Scene features the instrument in "Tremoloa Debut."

The tremoloa simulates the tonal effects of the Hawaiian steel guitar by passing a weighted roller stabilized by a swinging lever termed an arm, along a melody string. Following, moving the roller after plucking creates tremolo, an effect which gave rise to its name.  Additionally, the tremoloa possesses four chords (C, G, F, and D major), to strum out the harmony.

The patent for the tremoloa was granted in 1932 to Harold Finney and John H. Large.

See also
3rd Bridge
Ukelin, an instrument by John H. Large.

References

External links

Zithers
String instruments
Box zithers